Amer Dupovac (born 29 May 1991) is a Bosnian professional footballer who plays as a centre-back for Bosnian Premier League club Sarajevo.

Club career
Dupovac started playing with hometown club Sarajevo where, after playing in the youth squad, he debuted as senior in the 2010–11 Bosnian Premier League season.

He played with Sarajevo in the Bosnian Premier League until the winter break of the 2014–15 season, when he moved to Moldovan National Division side Sheriff Tiraspol. Two years later, at the winter break of the 2016–17 season, Dupovac moved to Croatian side Split, playing in the 1. HNL.

The following summer, he left Croatia and moved to Serbia where he signed with SuperLiga side Borac Čačak. He left Borac in June 2018.

On 22 June 2018, after three and a half years he came back to Sarajevo and signed a two-year contract. Dupovac scored his fifth goals for Sarajevo on 10 April 2019, in a 5–0 home win against Sloga Gornje Crnjelovo in the 2018–19 Bosnian Cup semi final game. He scored two goals in that game. In the 2018–19 season, Dupovac won the double with Sarajevo, winning both the Bosnian Premier League and the Bosnian Cup.

He won his second league title with the club on 1 June 2020, though after the 2019–20 Bosnian Premier League season was ended abruptly due to the COVID-19 pandemic in Bosnia and Herzegovina and after which Sarajevo were by default crowned league champions for a second consecutive time. Dupovac extended his contract with Sarajevo on 17 June 2020, lasting until June 2022. On 21 February 2021, he again extended his contract with the club until June 2024.

International career
Dupovac was a member of the Bosnia and Herzegovina U21 team in 2011.

That same year, on 16 December 2011, Dupovac made an appearance for the Bosnia and Herzegovina national team in a friendly match against Poland.

Career statistics

Club

International

Honours
Sarajevo
Bosnian Premier League: 2018–19, 2019–20 
Bosnian Cup: 2013–14, 2018–19, 2020–21

Sheriff Tiraspol 
Divizia Națională: 2015–16
Moldovan Cup: 2014–15
Moldovan Super Cup: 2015, 2016

References

External links

1991 births
Living people
Footballers from Sarajevo
Association football central defenders
Bosnia and Herzegovina footballers
Bosnia and Herzegovina under-21 international footballers
Bosnia and Herzegovina international footballers
FK Sarajevo players
FC Sheriff Tiraspol players
RNK Split players
FK Borac Čačak players
Premier League of Bosnia and Herzegovina players
Moldovan Super Liga players
Croatian Football League players
Serbian SuperLiga players
Bosnia and Herzegovina expatriate footballers
Expatriate footballers in Moldova
Bosnia and Herzegovina expatriate sportspeople in Moldova
Expatriate footballers in Croatia
Bosnia and Herzegovina expatriate sportspeople in Croatia
Expatriate footballers in Serbia
Bosnia and Herzegovina expatriate sportspeople in Serbia